Nshan Munchyan (born June 24, 1963 in Yerevan, Armenian SSR) is a retired Armenian boxer. He is a former World, European, four-time Soviet and multi-time Armenian Champion.

Biography
Nshan started boxing in Armenia in 1976. He began boxing under the Soviet Union. Munchyan won a gold medal at the 1987 European Amateur Boxing Championships. After the Union's fall in 1991, Munchyan began representing his native Armenia. He won a gold medal at the 1993 World Amateur Boxing Championships and a gold medal at the 1994 World Cup. He is the first boxer from the independent Armenia to win a medal in either competition.

Munchyan competed at the 1996 Summer Olympics where, after receiving a first round bye, he lost to Daniel Petrov, whom he previously defeated at the 1993 World Championships finals. Petrov went on to win the Olympic gold medal.

He is married and has three children.

Olympic Games Results
1996
1st round bye
Lost to Daniel Petrov (Bulgaria) 5-11

World Amateur Championships Results
1986
Lost to Luis Rolon (Puerto Rico) 1-4

1989
Defeated Leszek Olszewski (Poland) RSC 1
Defeated Erdenentsogt Tsogtjargal (Mongolia) 17-9
Lost to Rogelio Marcelo (Cuba) 20-23

1993
Defeated Bernard Inom (France) 23-9
Defeated Eduard Gaifulin (Russia) 11-0
Defeated Albert Guardado (United States) 7-2
Defeated Daniel Petrov (Bulgaria) 8-6

1995
Defeated Pal Lakatos (Hungary) 11-11
Lost to Andrzej Rzany (Poland) 6-6

European Championships Results
1987
1st round bye
Defeated Robert Isaszegi (Hungary) 5-0
Defeated Adrian Amzer (Romania) 5-0
Defeated Krasimir Cholakov (Bulgaria) 4-1

1989
Defeated Luigi Castiglione (Italy) 4-1
Lost to Robert Isaszegi (Hungary) DQ 3

1991
Defeated Jan Quast (Germany) 25-20
Lost to Pal Lakatos (Hungary) 19-23

World Cup Results
1994
Defeated Bulat Jumadilov (Kazakhstan) 12-8
Defeated Bernard Inom (France) 13-8
Defeated Pramunasak Phosuwan (Thailand) 11-6
Defeated Rafael Lozano (Spain) 15-6

References

External links
 Profile
 Sports-Reference.com

1963 births
Living people
Sportspeople from Yerevan
Light-flyweight boxers
Flyweight boxers
Soviet male boxers
Olympic boxers of Armenia
Boxers at the 1996 Summer Olympics
Honoured Masters of Sport of the USSR
Armenian male boxers
Soviet Armenians
AIBA World Boxing Championships medalists
Goodwill Games medalists in boxing
Competitors at the 1986 Goodwill Games
Competitors at the 1990 Goodwill Games